Prodemoticus is a genus of parasitic flies in the family Tachinidae. There are at least two described species in Prodemoticus.

Species
These two species belong to the genus Prodemoticus:
 Prodemoticus moderatus Kugler, 1980
 Prodemoticus orientalis Villeneuve, 1919

References

Further reading

 
 
 
 

Tachinidae
Articles created by Qbugbot